Qaableh is a town in the eastern Sanaag region of Somaliland. It is the site of numerous archaeological sites and ancient tombs.

Overview
Qa'ableh is located near the historical ruins of Haylan. An ancient city, it is home to numerous archaeological sites and structures, similar to those found in Qombo'ul and El Ayo, two other old towns in east Somaliland. Most of these historical sites have still yet to be fully explored.

Qa'ableh also notably serves as the seat of the tomb of Harti, the founding father of the Harti confederation of Darod sub-clans. Sheikh Darod's grave is situated nearby in the Hadaaftimo Mountains, and is the scene of frequent pilgrimages.

The town is believed to harbor the tombs of former kings from early periods of Somali history, as evidenced by the many ancient burial structures and cairns (taalo) that are found scattered within this region.

Historical tombs

See also
Administrative divisions of Somaliland
Regions of Somaliland
Districts of Somaliland
Somalia–Somaliland border

Darod
El Ayo
Haylan
Qombo'ul
Maydh
Gelweita

Notes

References
LaasqorayNET
Maakhir.com
Dhahar Online
Hadaaftimo.com

Archaeological sites in Somaliland
Populated places in Sanaag
Archaeological sites of Eastern Africa